EXR KOREA Co., Ltd. (hangul:이엑스알 코리아) is a clothing designer and retailer, based in South Korea.
EXR was founded as a subsidiary of SungWoo Hightech in 2001. Due to the successful product positioning in the niche market of sportswear industry, EXR has become one of the premium clothing brands in Korean fashion market just after 3 years of the launching. With its innovative Concepts of Caports (Character Sports Casual), EXR's sales revenue in 2013 is expected to amount to $140 million.

Corporate history

Aug 2001, EXR Korea established
Jan 2002, EXR shop #1 opened at Galleria Department Store (Seoul)
February 2002, Introduced the first fingerprint-recognition-based customer management system in Korea
September 2002, Officially sponsored the 1st Korean Supermodel Contest
September 2003, Officially sponsored the 2nd Korean Supermodel Contest
Aug 2003, EXR shop #100 opened
October 2003, Head office relocated (481-5, Bangbae-3-dong, Seocho-gu)
December 2003, Received ‘the Market Leading Brand in 2004’ award and ‘the Best Brand’ award from top tier press (Fashion Insight. Apparel News, Texherald, the Korea Economic Daily)
February 2004,	Built the EXR distribution center (Yangji-myeon, Yongin, Gyeonggi-do)
February 2004, Received the ‘Best Brand’ Award from Debec Plaza (First among the 180 brand shops in the department store)
Aug 2004, EXR shop #1 opened in China (at Nextage Dept, Shanghai  China)
Dec 2004, Received the‘2004 Best Brand’Award from Korea Fashion Associates
Apr 2005, Established EXR Japan, a joint venture, in Japan
Aug 2005, EXR shop #1 opened at Nagoya in Japan
Aug 2006, EXR Indonesia established and shop #1 opened

External links
EXR HQ
EXR Japan
EXR China

Clothing companies of South Korea